Kaduna United Football Club is a Nigerian football club based in Kaduna and run by the Kaduna State government.

History
The club was relegated from the Nigerian Premier League in 2007 but won promotion just one year later. After 2011, they were no longer in premier league and they still aren't as of 2016.
The government set up a new management team in 2021 that will play in the Nigeria Nationwide League.

Their home stadium is Kaduna Township Stadium.

Achievements
Nigerian FA Cup: 1
2010.

Performance in CAF competitions
CAF Confederation Cup: 1 appearance
2011 – Group stage

Notes

External links
 Club logo
 LMC fines Kaduna United, bans Supporters Club

Football clubs in Nigeria
Kaduna State
2000 establishments in Nigeria
Sports clubs in Nigeria
Association football clubs established in 2000